Meladze is a Georgian surname. Notable people with the surname include:

Konstantin Meladze (born 1963), Ukrainian-Russian composer and producer
Mevlud Meladze (born 1972), Georgian racing driver
Sergey Meladze (born 1980), Paralympic powerlifter who represented Turkmenistan at the 2012 Summer Paralympics
Valery Meladze (born 1965), Russian singer and a Meritorious Artist of Russia

Surnames of Georgian origin
Georgian-language surnames